The White Stripes Greatest Hits (also referred to as My Sister Thanks You and I Thank You: The White Stripes Greatest Hits) is a compilation album by the White Stripes, released through Third Man Records in America on December 4, 2020 (internationally in February 2021). The album comprises 26 songs from all six of the band's studio albums, including two songs originally released on standalone singles. On December 22, 2020, the band released an accompanying yule log video; a 90-minute animation directed by Noah Sterling featuring the artwork of Blue J.

Background
The album is the band's only compilation in their history, and only non-live or non-video release since dissolving in 2011. It was announced on October 6, with a statement from the band's record label reading (in part): "We get that the idea of 'Greatest Hits' may seem irrelevant in the era of streaming, but we also wholeheartedly believe that great bands deserve a 'Greatest Hits'".

Track listing

Personnel
The White Stripes
 Jack White – guitar, vocals, piano, organ, synthesizer, marimba
 Meg White – drums, vocals

Artwork
 Pieter M. van Hattem – photography
 Jordan Williams – design

Charts

Weekly charts

Year-end charts

References

External links
 

2020 greatest hits albums
The White Stripes albums
Third Man Records compilation albums